Peer Jöchel (born 6 March 1967 in Kiel) is a German bobsledder who competed in the early 1990s. He won a gold medal in the two-man event at the 1993 FIBT World Championships in Igls.

References
Bobsleigh two-man world championship medalists since 1931

1967 births
German male bobsledders
Living people
Sportspeople from Kiel